Francisco Rafael Loureiro Afonso (born 24 April 1997, in Estarreja) is a Portuguese footballer who plays for S.C. Salgueiros as a defender.

Football career
On 30 April 2016, Afonso made his professional debut with Paços Ferreira in a 2015–16 Primeira Liga match against Belenenses.

References

External links

Stats and profile at LPFP 
National team data 

1997 births
Living people
Portuguese footballers
Association football fullbacks
Primeira Liga players
Campeonato de Portugal (league) players
F.C. Paços de Ferreira players
A.R. São Martinho players
Berço SC players
S.C. Salgueiros players
Portugal youth international footballers
Sportspeople from Aveiro District